Aino-Kaisa Saarinen (born 1 February 1979) is a retired Finnish cross-country skier who competed in the World Cup between 1998 and 2018. With 354 individual World Cup starts, Saarinen is the current record holder for both men and women, with Stefanie Böhler in second place with 343.

Career
Competing in two Winter Olympics, she won three bronze medals with one in 2006 (Team sprint) and two in 2010 (30 km, 4 × 5 km relay).

Saarinen also won six medals at the FIS Nordic World Ski Championships with four golds (Team sprint: 2009, 10 km: 2009, 4 × 5 km relay: 2007, 2009) and two bronze (7.5 km + 7.5 km double pursuit: 2009, 10 km: 2011). She has six individual victories in FIS races since 2002, but did not win her first World Cup event until she won the 30 km classical event at the Holmenkollen ski festival on March 17, 2007.

Saarinen finished second in the 2008/09 Tour de Ski behind Virpi Kuitunen.

Cross-country skiing results
All results are sourced from the International Ski Federation (FIS).

Olympic Games
 5 medals – (2 silver, 3 bronze)

World Championships
 10 medals – (4 gold, 1 silver, 5 bronze)

'a.'  Cancelled due to extremely cold weather.

World Cup

Season standings

Individual podiums
4 victories – (3 , 1 )
35 podiums – (24 , 11 )

Team podiums
3 victories – (2 , 1 )
26 podiums – (20 , 6 )

References

External links

Official website 
Holmenkollen winners since 1892 – click Vinnere for downloadable pdf file 

1979 births
Living people
People from Hollola
Cross-country skiers at the 2006 Winter Olympics
Cross-country skiers at the 2010 Winter Olympics
Cross-country skiers at the 2014 Winter Olympics
Cross-country skiers at the 2018 Winter Olympics
Finnish female cross-country skiers
Holmenkollen Ski Festival winners
Olympic cross-country skiers of Finland
Olympic silver medalists for Finland
Olympic bronze medalists for Finland
Olympic medalists in cross-country skiing
FIS Nordic World Ski Championships medalists in cross-country skiing
Tour de Ski skiers
Medalists at the 2006 Winter Olympics
Medalists at the 2010 Winter Olympics
Medalists at the 2014 Winter Olympics
Sportspeople from Päijät-Häme
21st-century Finnish women